The Winnipeg Manitoba Temple is a temple of the Church of Jesus Christ of Latter-day Saints (LDS Church) in Winnipeg, Manitoba.

History
The intent to construct the temple was announced by church president Thomas S. Monson on April 2, 2011, during the annual general conference.

The Winnipeg Manitoba Temple is the ninth temple built in Canada and the first in Manitoba.  On December 3, 2016, a groundbreaking ceremony to signify beginning of construction took place with Larry Y. Wilson, executive director of the church's Temple Department, presiding.

On April 30, 2020, the LDS Church announced that a public open house was scheduled to occur from October 22 through 31, 2020, excluding Sunday October 25.  A youth devotional was originally scheduled for November 7, 2020, with the dedication anticipated the next day. Gerrit W. Gong, a member of the Quorum of the Twelve Apostles had been assigned to preside at those events. Subsequently, on September 1, 2020, the temple's open house and dedication were postponed due to the COVID-19 pandemic, with revised opening dates to be set once large public gatherings are permitted by government. The temple was dedicated by Gong on October 31, 2021.

See also

 Comparison of temples of The Church of Jesus Christ of Latter-day Saints
 List of temples of The Church of Jesus Christ of Latter-day Saints
 List of temples of The Church of Jesus Christ of Latter-day Saints by geographic region
 Temple architecture (Latter-day Saints)
 The Church of Jesus Christ of Latter-day Saints in Canada

References

External links
Winnipeg Manitoba Temple at ChurchofJesusChristTemples.org

Proposed religious buildings and structures of the Church of Jesus Christ of Latter-day Saints
Temples (LDS Church) in Canada
21st-century Latter Day Saint temples
Religious buildings and structures in Winnipeg
Fort Garry, Winnipeg
21st-century religious buildings and structures in Canada